Aghur (also Romanized as Āghūr; also known as Aghar and Āghūz) is a village in Dowlatabad Rural District, in the Central District of Abhar County, Zanjan Province, Iran. At the 2006 census, its population was 352, in 73 families.

References 

Populated places in Abhar County